A knowledge graph is a knowledge base that uses a graph-structured data model.

Knowledge Graph may also refer to:
 Google Knowledge Graph, a knowledge graph that powers the Google search engine and other services
 Bing Knowledge Graph or Satori, used by the Bing search engine
 LinkedIn Knowledge Graph (LKG), a knowledge base for LinkedIn

See also
 Conceptual graph
 Graph database
 Knowledge base
 Knowledge engine (disambiguation)
 Social graph, such as Facebook's "entity graph"